Otto Bökman (3 May 1874 – 22 November 1938) was a Swedish sports shooter. He competed in the men's trap event at the 1912 Summer Olympics.

References

External links
 

1874 births
1938 deaths
Swedish male sport shooters
Olympic shooters of Sweden
Shooters at the 1912 Summer Olympics
Sportspeople from Västra Götaland County